Hédi Amara Nouira (5 April 1911 – 25 January 1993) was a Tunisian politician. He served as the 2nd Prime Minister of Tunisia between 1970 and 1980.

Biography
Hédi Nouira was appointed as the governor of the Central Bank of Tunisia in 1958. Following the failure of a short-lived Socialist experiment in the 1960s, Nouira liberalised the economy during the 1970s. In 1970, the then Governor of the Central Bank of Tunisia, Nouira was appointed Prime Minister. The most decisive factor in Nouira's appointment seemed to be his commitment to private initiative as well as his financier's background.

He retired from politics in 1980 after suffering a stroke. Nouira died on January 25, 1993, after suffering from an illness that local media did not want to disclose.

References

External links

1911 births
1993 deaths
Prime Ministers of Tunisia
Finance ministers of Tunisia
Socialist Destourian Party politicians
Governors of the Central Bank of Tunisia
20th-century Tunisian politicians
Interior ministers of Tunisia